Texas Chainsaw 3D (stylized on-screen simply as Texas Chainsaw) is a 2013 American slasher film directed by John Luessenhop, with a screenplay by Adam Marcus, Debra Sullivan and Kirsten Elms. 

It is the seventh installment in The Texas Chainsaw Massacre franchise and serves as a direct sequel to the 1974 film The Texas Chain Saw Massacre. The film stars Alexandra Daddario, Dan Yeager, Tremaine 'Trey Songz' Neverson, Tania Raymonde, Thom Barry, Paul Rae, Bill Moseley, and Gunnar Hansen in a "special appearance".

The story centers on a woman who, upon discovering she's adopted, goes on a road trip with her friends to collect her inheritance, and ends up encountering the serial killer, Leatherface.

Texas Chainsaw 3D was released on January 4, 2013, and grossed $47.2 million while receiving negative reviews from critics. A prequel that takes place before the original film, titled Leatherface, was released in 2017 and another sequel, Texas Chainsaw Massacre, was released in 2022.

Plot
Following the events of the original film, the people of Newt, Texas, led by Burt Hartman, arrive and burn down the farmhouse of the murderous Sawyer clan in an act of vigilante justice. The arsonists are proclaimed heroes of the community, and the entire Sawyer family is killed. However, an infant with a burn mark on her chest is found by one of the townsmen, Gavin Miller, who promptly murders her mother, Loretta Sawyer. Gavin and his wife take the child into their care and raise her as their own daughter.

In 2011, a young woman named Heather discovers that she was adopted after receiving a letter informing her that her grandmother, Verna Carson, has passed away. Heather, her boyfriend Ryan, her best friend Nikki, and Nikki's boyfriend Kenny travel to her grandmother's home to collect her inheritance. Along the way, the group picks up a hitchhiker named Darryl. Upon arriving, Heather is given a letter from Verna's lawyer that she neglects to read. As the group explores the house, they decide to stay the night. Heather and her friends leave to buy food and supplies, leaving Darryl behind to look after the house. Darryl begins stealing valuables and is killed by Leatherface in the basement.

Heather and her friends return to find the house ransacked. While Kenny is preparing dinner, he goes downstairs to the cellar where Leatherface impales him on a hook, before killing him with a chainsaw. Heather finds Verna's decomposing body upstairs and is attacked by Leatherface in the kitchen, but she manages to escape. Nikki and Ryan draw the attention of Leatherface, while Heather gets in the van and picks up her friends. Using his chainsaw, Leatherface cuts through one of the tires, which causes the van to crash, killing Ryan on impact. He chases Heather to a nearby carnival, where Deputy Carl is patrolling the grounds.

While at the police department, Heather begins digging through the files, learning how the Sawyer family was killed and empathizing with them. The sheriff and Hartman send an officer to investigate the Carson estate. Over the phone, the officer reports his findings. He finds Nikki hiding in a freezer but accidentally shoots her in the head before he himself is killed by Leatherface. Leatherface skins the flesh from the officer's cadaver and uses it to create a new flesh mask. Enraged by the officer's findings, Hartman vows to end the remaining Sawyers. Heather leaves the station and meets with her lawyer at a bar. He tells her that Leatherface is her cousin, who survived the burning of the farmhouse. Heather escapes the bar when Hartman finds her and runs into Deputy Carl in his patrol car. As they drive away, Carl reveals himself as Burt's son. He kidnaps her and takes her to the Sawyer family's slaughterhouse, and ties her up to lure Leatherface.

Listening over the deceased officer's police radio, Leatherface learns of Heather's location and goes to the slaughterhouse to kill her. When he sees a Sawyer sigil birth mark on Heather's chest, he releases her. Leatherface is attacked from behind by Hartman and his friend Ollie. Heather takes the opportunity to escape. As Hartman and Ollie prepare to throw Leatherface into a meat grinder, Heather returns and kills Ollie, and tosses Leatherface his chainsaw. In the struggle, the sheriff arrives but hesitates to stop Leatherface from killing Burt. Leatherface uses his chainsaw to force Hartman to his death in the meat grinder.

The sheriff lets Heather and Leatherface go. Afterwards, Leatherface and Heather return to the Carson Estate, where Heather reads the letter from Verna. It informs her that her real name is Edith Rose Sawyer, that Leatherface lives in the basement behind the metal door and that he will protect her for the rest of his life, but it also requests that she take care of him in return. Leatherface buries Verna's body. Heather accepts how Leatherface's mental state drove him to commit his crimes and accepts him as her only family.

In a post-credits scene, Heather's adoptive parents arrive at the Carson estate to visit Heather, intending on greedily splitting her assets. As they wait in front of the door, Leatherface comes through the door with his chainsaw in hand.

Cast

 Alexandra Daddario as Heather Miller
 Dan Yeager as Leatherface
 Tremaine 'Trey Songz' Neverson as Ryan
 Scott Eastwood as Carl 
 Tania Raymonde as Nikki
 Shaun Sipos as Darryl
 Keram Malicki-Sanchez as Kenny
 James MacDonald as Officer Marvin
 Thom Barry as Sheriff Hooper
 Paul Rae as Burt Hartman
 Richard Riehle as Farnsworth
 Bill Moseley as Drayton Sawyer
 Gunnar Hansen as Boss Sawyer
 David Born as Gavin Miller
 Sue Rock as Arlene Miller
 Ritchie Montgomery as Ollie
 Marilyn Burns as Verna 
 Dodie L. Brown as Loretta Sawyer
 David "Bear" Bell as Bear Sawyer
 John Dugan as Grandfather Sawyer

Production

In January 2007, Platinum Dunes executives Bradley Fuller and Andrew Form stated that the company would not be producing the third film in the Texas Chainsaw Massacre reboot franchise. In October 2009, it was announced that Twisted Pictures and Lionsgate Films were attempting to purchase the rights to the franchise from New Line Cinema, with Twisted Pictures producing and Lionsgate distributing. According to Variety writer Michael Fleming, the plan was to create a contemporary film in 3-D, with Stephen Susco writing the script. The contract, with rights-holders Bob Kuhn and Kim Henkel, would be for multiple films. A trilogy of films were planned with Susco writing and James Wan directing the first installment and Hooper helming the second. 

In May 2011, Lionsgate announced that it would be partnering with Nu Image to produce the new Texas Chainsaw Massacre, and that John Luessenhop would direct the film. Mazzocone would act as producer, with production having been set to begin in June 2011. Mazzocone also stated that the story would pick up where Tobe Hooper's original film ends. Adam Marcus and Debra Sullivan were brought in to write the script; Kirsten Elms and Luessenhop worked on rewrites and script polishing. 

Gunnar Hansen, who portrayed Leatherface in the 1974 original film, was cast in a different role as Boss Sawyer. Similarly, Marilyn Burns portrayed Sally Hardesty in the original film but was cast as a nurse in Texas Chainsaw 3D.

Under the working title Leatherface 3D, principal photography took place in Shreveport, Louisiana between June and August 2011. The film was shot with a production budget of $20 million and on a 28 day schedule.  Markus unexpectedly had to take over the second unit as stereographer. Production switched to a 24-hour shooting schedule in order to meet the filming deadline.

Release
Texas Chainsaw 3D was originally scheduled to be released theatrically on October 5, 2012 but was delayed to a January 4, 2013 release. On May 14, 2013, the film was released on DVD and Blu-ray/Blu-ray 3D, which includes an UltraViolet digital copy of the film along with multiple commentaries and featurettes, an alternate opening and the trailer.

Reception

Box office
On its opening day, Texas Chainsaw 3D took first place, earning $10.2 million. The film debuted in first place, making $21.7 million. It went on to make a total of $47.3 million worldwide.

Critical response

On Rotten Tomatoes, Texas Chainsaw 3D has an approval rating of 20% based on 79 reviews, with an average rating of 3.6/10. The site's critical consensus reads, "As an ugly and cynical attempt to rebrand Leatherface as horror anti-hero, Texas Chainsaw 3D is a bold move for the franchise." On Metacritic, the film has a score of 31 out of 100, based on 17 critics, indicating "generally unfavorable reviews". Audiences surveyed by CinemaScore gave the film an average grade of "C+" on an A+ to F scale, with 63% of moviegoers being under the age of 25.

IGN editor Eric Goldman wrote, "A few fun 3D-aided jump-scares aside, Texas Chainsaw 3D is a generic and laughable attempt to follow the original."

Merchandise
In March 2015, Hollywood Collectibles released a 20-inch Leatherface action figure, based on Dan Yeager’s portrayal of the character.

References

External links
 
 
 
 
 

2013 3D films
2013 films
2013 horror films
2013 horror thriller films
2010s serial killer films
2010s slasher films
Alternative sequel films
American 3D films
American horror thriller films
American sequel films
American slasher films
American vigilante films
2010s English-language films
Halloween horror films
Films about orphans
Films directed by John Luessenhop
Films produced by Kim Henkel
Films scored by John Frizzell (composer)
Films set in 1973
Films set in 2011
Films set in Texas
Films shot in Louisiana
Films with screenplays by Stephen Susco
The Texas Chainsaw Massacre (franchise) films
2010s American films